The Lampsins were an aristocratic family in the Netherlands, who attained notability in the trading and colonial worlds in the 17th century. The most notable members of the family were brothers Adrian and Cornelius Lampsins, who were granted letters of patent by Louis XIV and became the Barons of colonial Tobago in 1662.

The Lampsins family owned a trading house in Vlissingen, and Cornelius owned a fleet of over three hundred trading ships, in both the East and West Indies.

The Lampsins merchant house was the first employer of the famed admiral Michiel de Ruyter.

Famous scions
 Adrian Lampsins (1598-1673), Baron of Tobago
 Cornelius Lampsins (1600-1664), Baron of Tobago, Governor of the Dutch West India Company
 Apollonius Lampsins (1674-1728), Governor of the Dutch East India Company, mayor of Middelburg
 Jan Cornelis Lampsins (1754-1834), Governor of the Dutch West India Company

References

External links
 Dutch Wikipedia

Dutch noble families
Barons of the Netherlands
Dutch-language surnames
Surnames of Dutch origin
History of Trinidad and Tobago